Olbramovice is name of several locations in the Czech Republic:

Olbramovice (Benešov District), a municipality and village in the Central Bohemian Region
Olbramovice (Znojmo District), a market town in the South Moravian Region